António Manuel Seixas Sampaio da Nóvoa GCIP ComRB (born 12 December 1954) is a Portuguese professor at the Faculty of Psychology and Education Sciences of the University of Lisbon, and former Rector of the same university. He was defeated as a candidate in the January 2016 Portuguese presidential election.

Distinctions

Orders
  Grand Cross of the Order of Public Instruction,  (4 October 2005)
  Commander of the Order of Rio Branco,  (21 May 1999)

References

1954 births
Living people
People from Valença, Portugal
University of Geneva alumni
Paris-Sorbonne University alumni
Academic staff of the University of Lisbon
Candidates for President of Portugal
Permanent Delegates of Portugal to UNESCO